Bernartice is a municipality and village in Jeseník District in the Olomouc Region of the Czech Republic. It has about 900 inhabitants.

Administrative parts
Villages of Buková and Horní Heřmanice are administrative parts of Bernartice.

Geography
Bernartice is located on the border with Poland. It lies in the Silesian Lowlands. The village of Bernartice is located along the Vojtovický Creek.

History
The first written mention of Bernartice is from 1291. It was part of fragmented Piast-ruled Poland. As a result of further fragmentation it soon became part of the Duchy of Nysa, which later on passed under Bohemian suzerainty, and following the duchy's dissolution in 1850, it was incorporated directly into Bohemia. Following World War I, from 1918, it formed part of Czechoslovakia, and from 1938 to 1945 it was occupied by Germany.

During World War II, the Germans operated the E461 forced labour subcamp of the Stalag VIII-B/344 prisoner-of-war camp in the village.

Notable people
Josef Jüttner (1775–1848), cartographer and army general

References

External links

Villages in Jeseník District
Czech Silesia